Matea Ferk (born 8 June 1987 in Rijeka) is a retired alpine skier from Croatia.  She has competed for Croatia at both the 2006 and 2010 Olympics.  Her best result in the Olympics was a 34th place in the slalom in 2010.

References

External links
 
 
 
 

1987 births
Living people
Sportspeople from Rijeka
Croatian female alpine skiers
Olympic alpine skiers of Croatia
Alpine skiers at the 2006 Winter Olympics
Alpine skiers at the 2010 Winter Olympics